NewsWhip is a social media engagement tracking firm created by Paul Quigley and Andrew Mullaney in 2011. The company tracks content by amount and location of user engagement and also tracks audience interests and changes in interests over time.



History
Paul Quigley and Andrew Mullaney founded NewsWhip in April 2011. In September, they joined the National Digital Research Centre's LaunchPad Accelerator Program and later moved to Dogpatch Labs in Dublin. In 2012, NewsWhip received undisclosed angel investments from the NDRC, Hal Philipp, and Shane Naughton. In 2013, NewsWhip raised seed money of €825,000 from Allied Irish Banks Seed Capital Fund, Hal Philipp, Hannes Þór Smárason, Enterprise Ireland and others. In 2017, NewsWhip raised $6.4 million in series A funding, led by Tribal Ventures and including investors the Associated Press, Japanese publisher The Asahi Shimbun, Enterprise Ireland and AIB Seed Capital Fund.

NewsWhip opened their U.S office in New York City in 2014, at NeueHouse, 110 East 25th Street, New York, NY 10010.

Products and services
NewsWhip tracks news stories on social media platforms and their engagement rates and levels. The company also stores data over time to analyze for its customers. In 2012, NewsWhip launched its first product, Spike, a tool intended for use by newsrooms and those in marketing and public relations, as it tracks or sorts news postings by topic, language, location posted, time posted, social media platform, and engagement rate over time. In 2017, NewsWhip opened its historical database of audience engagement since 2014 as a beta product, Analytics, which also allows sorting by time frame and subject matter. NewsWhip also publishes monthly rankings of the top content publishes on social media platforms. The rankings have been used in articles on new media, technology, politics, and journalism and in articles on social media analysis. NewsWhip has worked with PR agencies, media organizations and NGOs, including the Associated Press, Condé Nast, The Washington Post, Amnesty International, Médecins Sans Frontières, and the WHO.

References

News aggregators
Social media companies
Analytics companies
Irish companies established in 2011